This is a list of tallest buildings in Austria. Only habitable buildings are ranked, which excludes radio masts and towers, observation towers, steeples, chimneys and other tall architectural structures. For those, see List of tallest structures in Austria.

Completed buildings

Buildings under construction

See also
List of tallest structures in Austria
List of tallest buildings in the European Union

References

External links
Emporis: Austria

Lists of buildings and structures in Austria
Austria
Austria